In physical chemistry, the Arrhenius equation is a formula for the temperature dependence of reaction rates. The equation was proposed by Svante Arrhenius in 1889, based on the work of Dutch chemist Jacobus Henricus van 't Hoff who had noted in 1884 that the van 't Hoff equation for the temperature dependence of equilibrium constants suggests such a formula for the rates of both forward and reverse reactions. This equation has a vast and important application in determining the rate of chemical reactions and for calculation of energy of activation. Arrhenius provided a physical justification and interpretation for the formula. Currently, it is best seen as an empirical relationship. It can be used to model the temperature variation of diffusion coefficients, population of crystal vacancies, creep rates, and many other thermally-induced processes/reactions. The Eyring equation, developed in 1935, also expresses the relationship between rate and energy.

Equation

The Arrhenius equation gives the dependence of the rate constant of a chemical reaction on the absolute temperature as

where
  is the rate constant (frequency of collisions resulting in a reaction),
  is the absolute temperature (in Kelvin or degree Rankine),
  is the pre-exponential factor. Arrhenius originally considered A to be a temperature-independent constant for each chemical reaction. However more recent treatments include some temperature dependence - see Modified Arrhenius equation below.
  is the activation energy for the reaction (in the same units as RT),
  is the universal gas constant.

Alternatively, the equation may be expressed as

where
 is the activation energy for the reaction (in the same units as kBT),
 is the Boltzmann constant.

The only difference is the energy units of : the former form uses energy per mole, which is common in chemistry, while the latter form uses energy per molecule directly, which is common in physics.
The different units are accounted for in using either the gas constant, or the Boltzmann constant, as the multiplier of temperature .

The units of the pre-exponential factor  are identical to those of the rate constant and will vary depending on the order of the reaction. If the reaction is first order it has the units: s−1, and for that reason it is often called the frequency factor or attempt frequency of the reaction. It can be seen that either increasing the temperature or decreasing the activation energy (for example through the use of catalysts) will result in an increase in rate of reaction.

Given the small temperature range of kinetic studies, it is reasonable to approximate the activation energy as being independent of the temperature. Similarly, under a wide range of practical conditions, the weak temperature dependence of the pre-exponential factor is negligible compared to the temperature dependence of the  factor; except in the case of "barrierless" diffusion-limited reactions, in which case the pre-exponential factor is dominant and is directly observable.

With this equation it can be roughly estimated that the rate of reaction increases by a factor of about 2 or 3 for every 10°C rise in temperature.

Arrhenius plot

Taking the natural logarithm of Arrhenius equation yields:

Rearranging yields:

This has the same form as an equation for a straight line:

where x is the reciprocal of T.

So, when a reaction has a rate constant that obeys the Arrhenius equation, a plot of ln k versus T−1 gives a straight line, whose gradient and intercept can be used to determine Ea and A . This procedure has become so common in experimental chemical kinetics that practitioners have taken to using it to define the activation energy for a reaction. That is the activation energy is defined to be (−R) times the slope of a plot of ln k vs. (1/T):

Modified Arrhenius equation
The modified Arrhenius equation makes explicit the temperature dependence of the pre-exponential factor. The modified equation is usually of the form

The original Arrhenius expression above corresponds to n = 0. Fitted rate constants typically lie in the range . Theoretical analyses yield various predictions for n. It has been pointed out that "it is not feasible to establish, on the basis of temperature studies of the rate constant, whether the predicted T1/2 dependence of the pre-exponential factor is observed experimentally". However, if additional evidence is available, from theory and/or from experiment (such as density dependence), there is no obstacle to incisive tests of the Arrhenius law.

Another common modification is the stretched exponential form

where β is a dimensionless number of order 1. This is typically regarded as a purely empirical correction or fudge factor to make the model fit the data, but can have theoretical meaning, for example showing the presence of a range of activation energies or in special cases like the Mott variable range hopping.

Theoretical interpretation of the equation

Arrhenius's concept of activation energy
Arrhenius argued that for reactants to transform into products, they must first acquire a minimum amount of energy, called the activation energy Ea. At an absolute temperature T, the fraction of molecules that have a kinetic energy greater than Ea can be calculated from statistical mechanics. The concept of activation energy explains the exponential nature of the relationship, and in one way or another, it is present in all kinetic theories.

Collision theory

One approach is the collision theory of chemical reactions, developed by Max Trautz and William Lewis in the years 1916–18. In this theory, molecules are supposed to react if they collide with a relative kinetic energy along their line of centers that exceeds Ea. The number of binary collisions between two unlike molecules per second per unit volume is found to be

where NA is the Avogadro constant, dAB is the average diameter of A and B, T is the temperature which is multiplied by the Boltzmann constant kB to convert to energy units, and μAB is the reduced mass.

The rate constant is then calculated as  so that the collision theory predicts that the pre-exponential factor is equal to the collision number zAB. Here  is an empirical steric factor, often much less than 1.00, which is interpreted as the fraction of sufficiently energetic collisions in which the two molecules have the correct mutual orientation to react.

Transition state theory
The Eyring equation, another Arrhenius-like expression, appears in the "transition state theory" of chemical reactions, formulated by Wigner, Eyring, Polanyi and Evans in the 1930s. The Eyring equation can be written:

At first sight this looks like an exponential multiplied by a factor that is linear in temperature. However, free energy is itself a temperature dependent quantity. The free energy of activation  is the difference of an enthalpy term and an entropy term multiplied by the absolute temperature. The pre-exponential factor depends primarily on the entropy of activation. The overall expression again takes the form of an Arrhenius exponential (of enthalpy rather than energy) multiplied by a slowly varying function of T. The precise form of the temperature dependence depends upon the reaction, and can be calculated using formulas from statistical mechanics involving the partition functions of the reactants and of the activated complex.

Limitations of the idea of Arrhenius activation energy
Both the Arrhenius activation energy and the rate constant k are experimentally determined, and represent macroscopic reaction-specific parameters that are not simply related to threshold energies and the success of individual collisions at the molecular level. Consider a particular collision (an elementary reaction) between molecules A and B. The collision angle, the relative translational energy, the internal (particularly vibrational) energy will all determine the chance that the collision will produce a product molecule AB. Macroscopic measurements of E and k are the result of many individual collisions with differing collision parameters. To probe reaction rates at molecular level, experiments are conducted under near-collisional conditions and this subject is often called molecular reaction dynamics.

Another situation where the explanation of the Arrhenius equation parameters fall short is in heterogeneous catalysis, especially for reactions that show Langmuir-Hinshelwood kinetics. Clearly, molecules on surfaces do not "collide" directly, and a simple molecular cross-section does not apply here. Instead, the pre-exponential factor reflects the travel across the surface towards the active site.

There are deviations from the Arrhenius law during the glass transition in all classes of glass-forming matter. The Arrhenius law predicts that the motion of the structural units (atoms, molecules, ions, etc.) should slow down at a slower rate through the glass transition than is experimentally observed. In other words, the structural units slow down at a faster rate than is predicted by the Arrhenius law. This observation is made reasonable assuming that the units must overcome an energy barrier by means of a thermal activation energy. The thermal energy must be high enough to allow for translational motion of the units which leads to viscous flow of the material.

See also 
 Accelerated aging
 Eyring equation
 Q10 (temperature coefficient)
 Van 't Hoff equation
 Clausius–Clapeyron relation
 Gibbs–Helmholtz equation
 Cherry blossom frontpredicted using the Arrhenius equation

References

Bibliography

External links
 Carbon Dioxide solubility in Polyethylene – Using Arrhenius equation for calculating species solubility in polymers

Chemical kinetics
Equations
Statistical mechanics